Agonopterix cluniana is a moth of the family Depressariidae. It is found in the northern Alps in Austria.

Etymology
It is named for the Roman postal station Clunia in Feldkirch.

References

Moths described in 2000
Agonopterix
Moths of Europe